Crawford Symonds (15 February 1915 – 20 July 2000) was an Australian cricketer. He played in four first-class matches for South Australia in 1945/46.

See also
 List of South Australian representative cricketers

References

External links
 

1915 births
2000 deaths
Australian cricketers
South Australia cricketers
Cricketers from Adelaide